Heney may refer to:

 Daniel Henney is an American actor and model, born 28 November 1979 in Michigan (United States)
Francis J. Heney (1859–1937), American lawyer who served as Attorney General of the Arizona Territory between 1893 and 1895
Hugues Heney (1789–1844), lawyer and political figure in Lower Canada
Michael James Heney, railroad contractor best known for his work on the first two railroads built in Alaska
Thomas William Heney (1862–1928), Australian journalist and poet
Karen Sheffield Heney, Canadian judo champion

See also
 Henney Kilowatt, an electric car created in 1959 in United States on the base frame of Renault Dauphine
Henry (disambiguation)